Sympistis sectilis is a moth of the family Noctuidae first described by Smith in 1894. It is found in North America, including Texas.

The wingspan is 22–24 mm.

References

sectilis
Moths of North America
Moths described in 1894